Nursing Research is a peer-reviewed nursing journal covering a wide range of topics including health promotion, human responses to illness, acute care nursing research, symptom management, cost-effectiveness, vulnerable populations, health services, and community-based nursing studies. It is published by Wolters Kluwer and was established in 1952, with Helen L Bunge as its founding editor-in-chief. Its current editor-in-chief is Rita Pickler (Ohio State University).

Abstracting and indexing 
The journal is abstracted and indexed in  CINAHL and MEDLINE/PubMed. According to the Journal Citation Reports, the journal has a 2017 impact factor of 1.725.

References

External links

General nursing journals
Publications established in 1952
Wolters Kluwer academic journals